Ramsey High School may refer to:

Ramsey High School (Illinois), Ramsey, Illinois
Ramsey High School (New Jersey), Ramsey, New Jersey
Ramsey Street High School, Fayetteville, North Carolina